The Embassy of Ecuador in Washington, D.C., is the Republic of Ecuador's diplomatic mission to the United States. It is located at 2535 15th Street N.W. in Washington, D.C.'s Columbia Heights neighborhood. The current building has been used as an embassy since the 1960s.

The building was designed by architect George Oakley Totten, Jr. (1866-1939), who studied at the Ecole des Beaux-Arts and who also designed the Old Hungarian Embassy building next door at 2537 Fifteenth St.

The embassy also operates Consulates-General in Atlanta, Chicago, Houston, Los Angeles, Miami, Minneapolis, New Haven, New Orleans, New York City, Newark, Phoenix and San Francisco. The Chargé d'Affairs is Efraín Baus.

The chancery suffered damage in the 2011 Virginia earthquake on August 23, 2011. The earthquake caused cracks on internal walls and collapsed three of the building's chimneys. The chimney collapse damaged two cars.

On September 27, 2017, a two alarm fire broke out on the roof of the chancery.

See also
List of diplomatic missions in Washington, D.C.

References

External links

Official website
wikimapia

Columbia Heights, Washington, D.C.
Ecuador
Washington, D.C.
Ecuador–United States relations